Zhang Kehui (February 1928) is a Chinese politician. He was born in Changhua, Taiwan. From 1942 to 1948 he studied at Changhua Senior School of Commerce and Taiwan Normal College. In 1948 Zhang entered department of economics, Xiamen University. One year later, he became a PLA company commander. From 1952 to 1969, he served as a manager of CPC Fujian Province Party Committee United Front Department. From 1969 he was sent to Ninghua County for manual labour for 4 years.

From 1982 to 1991 Zhang served as the minister of United Front Department, Fujian province. From 1991 to 1997 he was the vice-chairman of Taiwan Democratic Self-Government League, and in 1997 the chairman of the league till 2005. He was also the President of All-China Federation of Taiwan Compatriots from 1991 to 1997, and Vice Chairman of the Chinese People's Political Consultative Conference from 1998 to 2008.

References

1928 births
National Taiwan Normal University alumni
Xiamen University alumni
Chinese police officers
People from Changhua County
Living people
Taiwanese emigrants to China
Chinese Communist Party politicians
Members of the Taiwan Democratic Self-Government League
Vice Chairpersons of the National Committee of the Chinese People's Political Consultative Conference
Politicians of the People's Republic of China
Leaders of political parties in China
Members of the 5th Chinese People's Political Consultative Conference
Members of the 7th Chinese People's Political Consultative Conference
Members of the Standing Committee of the 8th National People's Congress